Nanning Metro or Nanning Rail Transit (NNRT) is a rapid transit system in Nanning, the capital of Guangxi Zhuang Autonomous Region in China.

Lines in operation

History
Line 1 officially started construction on December 29, 2011. The first 11.2 km section, from Nanhu to Nanning East railway station, began operation June 28, 2016. The line opened fully on December 28, 2016. It is 32.1 km long, with 25 stations. Line 2 started construction in 2012 and was completed on December 28, 2017. Line 3 opened in June 2019. Line 4 opened in November 2020. Line 5 opened on December 16, 2021.

With the opening of Line 5, Nanning became the seventh city in China, and the first in Southern China to open and operate a fully automated subway line.

Future Expansion
It is planned that there will be four vertical and four horizontal lines totaling 252 km of subway. The system is projected to carry over 5 million passengers per day.

Line 4 will be extended from Lengtangcun to Longgang, adding 3 stations.

Network map

See also
List of metro systems

References

 
Rapid transit in China
Rail transport in Guangxi
2016 establishments in China